William Colgate (January 25, 1783 – March 25, 1857) was an English-American soap industrialist who founded in 1806 what became the Colgate-Palmolive company.

Early life
William Colgate was born in Hollingbourne, Kent, England, on January 25, 1783. He was the son of Robert Colgate and his wife Sarah (née Bowles). The family moved to a farm near Shoreham when William was six years old.

Robert Colgate (1758–1826) was an 18th-century English farmer, politician and sympathiser with the American War of Independence and French Revolution, whose republican ideals impelled him to leave their farm in Shoreham, Kent, in March 1798 and emigrate to Baltimore, Maryland, in the United States of America, after which the family settled on a farm in Harford County, Maryland. Colgate formed a partnership with Ralph Maher to manufacture soap and candles, and William helped the two men, but the partnership dissolved after two years. The family later settled in Delaware County, New York.

Career 
William Colgate went to New York City in 1804. He there obtained employment as an apprentice to a soap-boiler. He closely watched the methods practiced by his employer, noting what seemed to him to be mismanagement, and learned useful lessons for his own guidance. At the close of his apprenticeship he was enabled, by correspondence with dealers in other cities, to establish himself in the business with some assurance of success. In 1806 William established a starch, soap and candle business in Manhattan, on Dutch Street. In 1820, he started a starch factory across the Hudson in Jersey City. William followed his goal of prosperity through life, and became one of the most prosperous men in the city of New York. This circumstance, together with his great wisdom in counsel, and his readiness to aid in all useful and practicable enterprises, gave him a wide influence in the community, and especially in the denomination of which he was from early life an active and honored member.

Personal life
The Rev. William Parkinson, pastor of the First Baptist Church in the City of New York, baptized him in February 1808 and Colgate became a deacon. In 1811 he transferred his membership in Oliver Street Baptist Church. In 1838 he became a member of the Tabernacle Baptist Church (Manhattan), to the erection of which he had himself largely contributed.

Colgate was a tither throughout his long and successful business career. He gave not merely one-tenth of the earnings of Colgate's soap products; but he gave two-tenths, then three-tenths, and finally five-tenths of all his income to the work of God in the world. During the later days of his life he revealed the origin of his devotion to the idea of tithing. When he was sixteen years old he left home to find employment in New York City. He had previously worked in a soap manufacturing shop. When he told the captain of the canal boat upon which he was traveling that he planned to make soap in New York City the man gave him this advice: ‘Someone will soon be the leading soap maker in New York. You can be that person. But you must never lose sight of the fact that the soap you make has been given to you by God. Honor Him by sharing what you earn. Begin by tithing all you receive.’ William Colgate felt the urge to tithe because he recognized that God was the giver of all that he possessed, not only of opportunity, but even of the elements which were used in the manufacture of his products.

Family
Colgate married Mary Gilbert (1788-1855) on April 23, 1810, and they had nine children: Robert (1812-1885), Gilbert (1814-1838), Sarah (1816-1859), James (1818-1904), William III (1820-1838), Samuel (1822-1897), Mary IV (1826-1873), Joseph (1828-1865), and Martha (1831-1837). His son Robert purchased Stonehurst at Riverdale-on-Hudson in The Bronx about 1859 shortly after it was built; it was listed on the National Register of Historic Places in 1983.

Philanthropy
Colgate annually subscribed money to assist in defraying the expenses of Hamilton Literary and Theological Institution (later Madison University and Theological Seminary); and he was among the most strenuous opponents of their removal to the city of Rochester. His sons James and Samuel were both benefactors of Madison University and Theological Seminary. After seven decades of the Colgates' involvement, the school was renamed Colgate University in 1890.

Colgate was a regular contributor to the funds of the Baptist Missionary Union, and took upon himself the entire support of a foreign missionary.

References

Archives and records
 William Colgate and Company records at Baker Library Special Collections, Harvard Business School.

External links
 The Reformed Reader biography
 

1783 births
1857 deaths
Baptist deacon
People from Hollingbourne
People from Harford County, Maryland
Kingdom of Great Britain emigrants to the United States
Burials at Green-Wood Cemetery
19th-century English businesspeople
Colgate-Palmolive
American company founders
People from Shoreham, Kent
19th-century American businesspeople
Baptists from New York (state)
Colgate family